Colonel John Gotea Pressley House, also known as the Pressley-Hirsch-Green House and Wylma M. Green House is a historic home located at Kingstree, Williamsburg County, South Carolina.  It was built in 1855, and is a -story, weatherboard-clad Greek Revival style frame dwelling.  The front facade features a “rain porch” and a dormer with a Palladian window.  It was the home of Colonel John Gotea Pressley, a prominent local attorney, judge, and Confederate regimental field officer. It was listed in the National Register of Historic Places in 1997.

Pressley was.b9rn May 24, 1833.

References

Houses on the National Register of Historic Places in South Carolina
Greek Revival houses in South Carolina
Houses completed in 1855
Houses in Williamsburg County, South Carolina
National Register of Historic Places in Williamsburg County, South Carolina